was a Japanese literary critic.

Ogawa was born in Tokyo, and graduated from Meiji University's Literature Department in 1951. Having Shin'ichirō Nakamura as his mentor, he began writing poetry and literary criticism, and after a stint as a high school teacher in Tochigi Prefecture, he became an assistant professor at Showa Women's University. After retiring, he also worked as a lecturer at his alma mater and at Tokyo Denki University. After 1990 many of his writings centered on cherry blossoms.

He died on 20 September 2014 of stomach cancer.

Works (selection) 
 "Shiki" to sono shijin, 1970 
 Miyoshi Tatsuji kenkyū, 1970
 Shōwa jojōshi kenkyū : Tachihara Michizō kōshō to giron, 1971
 Miyoshi Tatsuji no sekai, 1972
 Itō Shizuo ron, 1973
 Shōwa bungaku ron kō, 1975
 Takahashi Kazumi kenkyū, 1976
 Tachihara Michizō kenkyū, 1977
 Gendaishi dochaku to genshitsu, 1976
 Ritoru magajin hakkutsu : bungakushi no suiheisen, 1976
 Shōwa bungaku no ichisokumen : shiteki kyōensha no bungaku, 1977
 Tachihara Michizō ai no tegami : bungaku arubamu, 1978
 Karuizawa : bundan shiryō, 1980
 Itō Shizuo : kokō no jojō shijin, 1980
 Bunmei kaika no shi, 1980
 Bungakuhi no aru fūkei : shi no kokoro shi no fūdo, 1983
 Hori Tatsuo sono ai to shi, 1984
 Mishima Yukio : han "Nihon rōmanha" ron, 1985
 Hori Tatsuo : sakka no kyōgai, 1986
 Sakura no bungakushi, 1991 
 Shōka, sanbika, gunka no shigen, 2005
 Sakura to Nihon bunka : seimeibi kara sange no hana e, 2007

References

External links 
"Prof. Ogawa's Room"

Japanese literary critics
People from Tokyo
Meiji University alumni
Academic staff of Showa Women's University
1930 births
2014 deaths
Deaths from stomach cancer